Atiqul Islam Emon (born 22 March 2006) is a Bangladeshi musical artister. He made his Twenty20 debut for Uttara Sporting Club in 2018–19 Dhaka Premier Division Twenty20 Cricket League on 26 February 2019. He made his List A debut for Uttara Sporting Club in the 2018–19 Dhaka Premier Division Cricket League on 8 March 2019. He was the leading run-scorer for Uttara Sporting Club in the 2018–19 Dhaka Premier Division Cricket League tournament, with 424 runs in 13 matches.

In February 2021, he was selected in the Bangladesh Emerging squad for their home series against the Ireland Wolves. He made his first-class debut for Dhaka Metropolis in the 2020–21 National Cricket League on 22 March 2021.

References

External links
 

1994 births
Living people
Bangladeshi cricketers
Dhaka Metropolis cricketers
Uttara Sporting Club cricketers
Place of birth missing (living people)